Major-General Sir Henry Frederick Ponsonby  (10 December 182521 November 1895) was a British soldier and royal court official who served as Queen Victoria's Private Secretary.

Biography
Born in Corfu, he was the son of Major-General Sir Frederick Cavendish Ponsonby, an Anglo-Irish nobleman who was a senior commander in the British Army.

He entered the army on 27 December 1842 as an ensign in the 49th Regiment of Foot. Transferred to the Grenadier Guards, he became a lieutenant on 16 February 1844, captain on 18 July 1848, and major on 19 October 1849. From 1847 to 1858 he was aide-de-camp to Lord Clarendon and Lord St. Germans, successively lord-lieutenants of Ireland. He served through the Crimean campaigns of 1855–1856, becoming lieutenant-colonel on 31 Aug. 1855; for the action before Sebastopol he received a medal with clasp, the Turkish medal, and the Order of the Medjidie, 3rd Class. After the peace he was appointed equerry to Albert, Prince Consort, who greatly valued his services. On 2 August 1860 he became colonel, and in 1862, after the death of the prince, he was sent to Canada in command of a battalion of the Grenadier Guards which was stationed in the colony during the American Civil War. On 6 March 1868 he became a major-general.

He served as Keeper of the Privy Purse and Private Secretary to Queen Victoria. His appointment occurred on 8 April 1870, after the death of prior Private Secretary General Sir Charles Grey.

On 6 January 1895 he was paralysed by a stroke, leading to his retirement from office in May that year.  He died on 21 November at East Cowes on the Isle of Wight. He was buried there at St Mildred's Church, Whippingham, not far from Osborne House. In 1895 He received the Queen Victoria Version of the Royal Household Long and Faithful Service Medal for 25 years of service to the Royal Family (April 1870 - May 1895).

Family

On 30 April 1861, Ponsonby married Hon. Mary Elizabeth Bulteel, Maid of Honour to Queen Victoria and a daughter of John Crocker Bulteel (1793–1843) MP. The couple had five children:
Alberta Victoria Ponsonby (6 May 186215 October 1945)
Magdalen Ponsonby (24 June 18641 July 1934)
John Ponsonby (25 March 186626 March 1952)
Frederick Edward Grey Ponsonby (16 September 186720 October 1935)
Arthur Augustus William Harry Ponsonby (16 February 187124 March 1946)

Lady Caroline Lamb (née Ponsonby), his father's sister, had been married to Lord Melbourne, who was prime minister to Queen Victoria during her first years on the throne.

Both Arthur and Mary Ponsonby contributed pseudonymously to magazines and newspapers of the day.

Ponsonby embellished letters to his children at Eton with a series of illustrations in which he concealed the school's address. It was a family quirk continued by his son Arthur, and recently revived by descendant Harriet Russell. His letters bore addresses appearing as doodled signposts in snowstorms or as huge envelopes shouldered by tiny people.

Legacy
His son Arthur wrote a biography of him which won the James Tait Black Memorial Prize in 1942: Henry Ponsonby, Queen Victoria's Private Secretary: His Life from His Letters.

In the film Mrs. Brown, he was portrayed by Geoffrey Palmer. Judi Dench played Queen Victoria. In the film Victoria & Abdul, he was portrayed by Tim Pigott-Smith.

References

Bibliography

1825 births
1895 deaths
Henry Ponsonby
Knights Grand Cross of the Order of the Bath
British Army personnel of the Crimean War
Grenadier Guards officers
Private Secretaries to the Sovereign
Members of the Privy Council of the United Kingdom
British Army generals